"Young and Beautiful" is a song by American singer and songwriter Lana Del Rey used for the soundtrack to the drama film The Great Gatsby.

Contemporary music critics lauded the single, calling it "haunting" and "somber". Lyrically, "Young and Beautiful" follows a young lover's apprehension about whether love can last. A music video, directed by Chris Sweeney and filmed by Sophie Muller, was released on May 10, 2013.

"Young and Beautiful" reached the top ten in Australia where it was later certified platinum by the Recording Industry Association of America (RIAA). In May 2013, the song broke into the Billboard Hot 100; it peaked at 22 on the chart, making it Del Rey's highest peak up to that point. Shortly after, the song also peaked at 3 on the Hot Rock Songs chart.

Del Rey and Nowels received accolades for their songwriting from various music and film awards, including nominations for Best Song Written for Visual Media at the 56th Annual Grammy Awards, and Best Song at the 19th Critics' Choice Awards. They eventually won the Best Original Song at the 18th Satellite Awards. On January 26, 2014, "Young and Beautiful" was announced as number 7 on the annual Triple J's Hottest 100 in Australia. In 2022, the song appeared in the trailer of the Amazon Prime Video documentary Lucy and Desi, which focuses on the love story of Lucille Ball and Desi Arnaz, stars of the sitcom I Love Lucy.

Background
Working with the film's director, co-writer, and co-producer Baz Luhrmann, Del Rey wrote the original song "Young and Beautiful" for the soundtrack of the 2013 film adaptation of the novel The Great Gatsby, written from the perspective of Daisy Buchanan.

In an interview with Catalunya Ràdio, Del Rey said she had three new songs for Paradise: "I Sing the Body Electric", "In the Land of Gods and Monsters" and "Will You Still Love Me When I'm No Longer Young and Beautiful." Del Rey sang the chorus of "Young and Beautiful" during the Catalunya Ràdio broadcast.

Baz Luhrmann later gave an interview which contained a Skype chat with Del Rey, where Luhrmann said "we are very lucky that the song found a film", implying the song had already been written before the film.

Luhrmann changed some of the lyrics in the beginning of the second verse from the demo version of "Will You Still Love Me" to fit with the film. Clearly, it always was intended for Paradise, which did get picked up by various media.

The song was released to contemporary hit radio as a single and was used as the film's kickoff single. A snippet of the track appeared in the official trailer for the film and played during the scene where the characters portrayed by Leonardo DiCaprio and Carey Mulligan express their romantic feelings for one another.

In October 2013, a remix by Cedric Gervais was commissioned for the record label Universal Germany. It was sent to Italian contemporary hit radio by Universal Music on January 10, 2014.

Composition

With the lyrics "Will you still love me when I'm no longer young and beautiful?", Del Rey adds a hint of desperation which parallels the idiosyncrasies faced by the characters in F. Scott Fitzgerald's classic novel The Great Gatsby. Del Rey's dreamy vocals are draped over sedated strings and canned percussion. The soft and dreary vocals, falling in line with Del Rey's retro affectation, fits the atmosphere of the 1920s when the novel is set. The lyrics rotate around the themes of pleasing a lover, nostalgia, and the gloom of aging. The Cedric Gervais remix of the song was released on October 11, 2013.

Music video
The music video for "Young and Beautiful" was set to be released on April 22, 2013, but was officially released on May 10, 2013. Directed by Chris Sweeney, the video's production was helmed by Adam Smith and Jacob Swan-Hyam, with Sophie Muller shooting the footage. Flanked by a full-string orchestra, Del Rey sings Dan Heath's Orchestral version of her song in 1920s art deco fashion. She is shown singing the song in a dark room with glittery diamond-tears on her cheek which look like tattoos. Jason Lipshutz of Billboard magazine described the video as "somber" and the singer's look as "especially demure". Lipshutz concluded that "the clip ends without ever reaching any kind of conclusion -- much like the rhetorical question 'Will you still love me when I'm no longer young and beautiful?' at the heart of the song." Spins Marc Hogan described it as "elegantly conceived, but succeed[s] only as much as the music does".

An edit of the video set to the Cedric Gervais remix was published on September 27, 2013.

Critical reception
Critical reception of "Young and Beautiful" has been fairly positive. Hip hop magazine Rap-Up called the single "haunting", while MTV called it "somber-sounding". Jason Lipshutz of Billboard called the ballad, "typically lush", paralleling the single with Del Rey's previous hits, "Video Games" and "Born to Die". Canadian journal National Post wrote "Young and Beautiful" picks up where "Video Games" left off, stating the song was relevant to the book because of "its obsession with decay and the fleeting nature of the good life certainly resonate." The journal continued to call it an "artifact" of Del Rey's consistently dark tone, adding that by the second play-through "its bald directness becomes its appeal." MTV commented that the track "falls very much in-line with what Lana Del Rey's fans have come to expect" from Del Rey. Jeff Benjamin of Fuse said the track featured "a big, sweeping ballad with piano, violins and Lana's warbly delivery." He added that "if the single takes off, perhaps the songbird can finally scrub her image clean of that 'Girl that totally f-cked up her Saturday Night Live debut' tag." Rolling Stone Jody Rosen recognized "Young and Beautiful" as the album's centerpiece, calling it "inert" and "a drag" despite its symmetry with the album's entire theme. Finding the track restrained in comparison to her earlier work, August Brown, writing for The Los Angeles Times, called the single "clean" and "classy". "Young and Beautiful" was given a positive review by Stereogums Tom Breihan, although he disapproved of the vapidity of the line: "make me wanna party". Nathan Ellis, writing for Far Out Magazine, praised the track for the "silky vocals" and "dulcet  tones."

The song was nominated for Best Song Written for Visual Media at the 56th Annual Grammy Awards.

Commercial performance
Debuting at number 89 on the United States' Billboard Hot 100, "Young and Beautiful" became Del Rey's second highest mark up to that point. With 48,000 units in first-week sales, the song also entered the Hot Digital Songs chart at 36. The song later peaked at number 22, became Del Rey's highest charting song at the time.

The single was sampled by Flo Rida's artist iRome on his Radio hit "Homicide" where Del Rey's vocals are heard throughout the song. "Young And Beautiful" became one of her best-selling singles in the United States, nearly on par with "Video Games", which is certified for 500,000 download and streaming units. Later that year, "Young and Beautiful" was nominated for Best Original Song at the World Soundtrack Awards 2013. It won the Best Original Song at the 18th Satellite Awards.

Accolades

Personnel
Credits adapted from the soundtrack's liner notes.

Original version
 Lana Del Rey – vocals, composition
 Rick Nowels – production, piano, keyboards, orchestration, composition
 Patrick Warren – strings, tubular bells, dulcitone, electric guitar, pump musette, piano
 Craig Armstrong – orchestral arrangement
 Perry Montague-Mason – orchestra leader
 Devrim Karaoglu – bass
 Kieron Menzies – recording, programming
 Al Shux – drum programming
 Dan Heath – orchestral drum programming
 Jon Ingoldsby – additional engineering
 Jordan Stilwell – additional engineering
 Trevor Yasuda – additional engineering
 Chris Barrett – assistant engineering
 John Prestage – assistant engineering
 Geoff Foster – orchestra recording
 Robert Orton – mixing
 David Greenaway – orchestra conductor
 Isobel Griffiths – orchestra contractor
 Charlotte Matthews – assistant orchestra contractor

"DH orchestral version"
 Lana Del Rey – vocals, composition
 Dan Heath – producer
 Rick Nowels – composition
 Kieron Menzies  – vocals recording
 Songa Lee  – violin
 Kathleen Sloan – violin
 Robert Orton – mixing
 Trevor Yasuda – engineering
 Chris Barrett – engineering
 John Prestage – engineering

Charts

Weekly charts

Original version

Cedric Gervais Remix

Year-end charts

Certifications

Release history

References

2010s ballads
2013 singles
2013 songs
Interscope Records singles
Spinnin' Records singles
Lana Del Rey songs
Cedric Gervais songs
Music videos directed by Sophie Muller
Number-one singles in Russia
Pop ballads
Song recordings produced by Rick Nowels
Songs written for films
Songs written by Lana Del Rey
Songs written by Rick Nowels
The Great Gatsby
Song recordings produced by Al Shux
Torch songs